Treetops Hotel was a hotel in Aberdare National Park in Kenya near the township of Nyeri, 1,966 m (6,450 ft) above sea level on the Aberdare Range and in sight of Mount Kenya. First opened in 1932 by Eric Sherbrooke Walker, it was built into the tops of the trees of Aberdare National Park as a treehouse, offering the guests a close view of the local wildlife. The idea was to provide a machan (hunting platform on a tree during shikar in India) experience in relative safety and comfort. From the original modest two-room tree house, it has grown into a 35-room hotel. The original structure was burned down by The Kenya Land and Freedom Army (KLFA) during the 1954 Mau Mau Uprising, but the hotel was rebuilt near the same waterhole and has become fashionable for many of the rich and famous. It includes observation lounges and ground-level photographic hides from which guests can observe the local wildlife which comes to the nearby waterholes. The hotel closed in October 2021.

The hotel is where Princess Elizabeth was staying in 1952 when she acceded to the thrones of the United Kingdom and the other Commonwealth realms, upon the death of her father, King George VI.

Beginnings

The initial idea of Major Eric Sherbrooke Walker, who owned land in the Aberdare Range, was to build a treehouse for his wife Lady Bettie. The idea grew, and in 1932 the couple oversaw the construction of a two-room treehouse in a huge 300-year-old fig tree as an adjunct facility to the Outspan Hotel in Nyeri, which they also built and owned. Initial construction was hampered by the presence of wild animals, as the treehouse was purposely built beside animal trails leading to a nearby waterhole. Labourers and supervisors were often chased away by wild animals, which led to increased labour costs.

While originally two rooms, and open only on Wednesday nights to overnight guests as a night-viewing platform, rising demand forced the Walkers to accommodate more visitors. The visit of Princess Elizabeth and her husband Prince Philip, Duke of Edinburgh in 1952 included a visit to Treetops as personal guests of the Walkers. The Treetops was reinforced, and its capacity increased to four rooms, including one for a resident hunter.

Accession of Queen Elizabeth II

Treetops became famous around the world when Princess Elizabeth, as she then was, stayed there at the time of the death of her father, King George VI. This occurred on the night of 5–6 February 1952. She learned of the king's death, however, after having departed, while the couple were at Sagana Lodge. She was the first British monarch since King George I to be outside the country at the moment of succession, and also the first in modern times not to know the exact time of her accession because her father had died in his sleep at an unknown time. On the night her father died, before the event was known, Sir Horace Hearne, then Chief Justice of Kenya, had escorted the princess and her husband, Prince Philip, to a state dinner at the Treetops Hotel. After word of George VI's death reached the new Queen the following day, she returned immediately to Britain.

The famous hunter Jim Corbett, who was invited by the princess to accompany them during their stay there, wrote in the visitors' log book:

For the first time in the history of the world, a young girl climbed into a tree one day a Princess and after having what she described as her most thrilling experience she climbed down from the tree next day a Queen – God bless her.

Political unrest
The Mau Mau Uprising, which began as a protest in 1951 and 1952 of British control in the Kikuyu homeland quickly became a violent uprising. It was suppressed by the British over the period 1953–1954. In 1953, the Aberdare forest provided refuge to many hundreds of Mau Mau rebels, led by Dedan Kimathi. In June 1953, the entire region was declared off-limits for Africans, and orders to shoot Africans on sight were set in place. A major military operation in late 1953 ("Operation Blitz") left 125 guerillas dead. This was followed in January 1954 by "Operation Hammer", led by the King's African Rifles, which however failed to encounter many guerillas as most had already left the area. As a protest against the shoot-on-sight orders, and repeated military action, Mau Mau rebels burnt down the Treetops Hotel (which acted as a lookout for the King's African Rifles) on 27 May 1954 in a contentious military action or act of terror. The incident took place as the uprising was slowly being brought to an end by British military action.

Present day

The Treetops was rebuilt in 1957 on a nearby chestnut tree overlooking the same waterhole and salt lick near the elephant migration pathway to Mount Kenya, and grew to 35 rooms, with the hotel being built on additional stilt supports. Rising out of the ground on stilts, it has four decks and a rooftop viewing platform.

The rise in popularity of the Treetops is partially due to Elizabeth II's visit and accession in 1952, but also partially due to their no see, no pay policy during their early years – a common business policy on safaris, where guests were not charged for services if they failed to see any big game.

Visitors can observe the wildlife from the top deck, the viewing windows in the communal space, or from ground level hides. They can also take motor tours from the Treetops. The Treetops remains an overnight destination, with only overnight luggage being allowed, and visitors being driven in from the Outspan Hotel for the night. Other facilities include a thousand watt artificial moon used to illuminate animals at the waterhole during darkness. Another unusual restriction at the Treetops is a low decibel level restriction due to the hearing sensitivity of many animals, including a ban on all hard-soled footwear.

Currently, the Treetops is run by the Aberdare Safari Hotels which acquired the two properties, Outspan Hotel and Treetops in 1978. Following the success of Treetops, another treetop lodge – the Shimba, was opened by the Aberdare Safari Hotels group in the Shimba Hills National Reserve.

Aberdare Safari Hotels have embarked on an initiative dubbed "Return the Bush" in conjunction with the Kenya Wildlife Service. The initiative involves the rehabilitation of 125 ha of Aberdare National park that has been degraded by the toll the fenced-in elephant population has exerted on the ecosystem. The electric fencing for the paddock covering an area of 16.5 ha around the lodge was completed. The paddocking enables reforestation as well as the natural regeneration of the local flora within the paddock.

The hotel closed in October 2021, after not hosting any guests for over a year due to a drop in tourism caused by the COVID-19 pandemic.

Notable visitors
Lord Baden-Powell, founder of the Boy Scouts movement, was a resident of Nyeri and a frequent visitor to Treetops. In 1938, he commissioned a cottage on the grounds of The Outspan Hotel, which he named Paxtu. The final resting place of Lord and Lady Baden-Powell is located nearby. Jim Corbett, hunter, conservationist, and author, who accompanied Elizabeth II during her stay at treetops on 6 February 1952, lived in the same house as Baden-Powell, and is buried nearby, next to Lord Baden-Powell and his wife Olave, Lady Baden-Powell.

The visit of Princess Elizabeth cemented the fame of The Treetops. The visit of Princess Elizabeth was immortalised by Jim Corbett (who was a resident "hunter" at Treetops) in his final book Tree Tops, which was published by the Oxford University Press in October 1955, six months after Corbett's death (19 April 1955). Archival footage of the royal visit has also survived. Following the media hype over the accession of Elizabeth II, the Treetops attracted a large number of rich and famous people. Famous personalities who have visited the Treetops include Charlie Chaplin, Joan Crawford and Lord Mountbatten,<ref>Nicholas Best, The Man from Treetops, Andrew Lownie Literary Agency</ref> and a return visit by Elizabeth II in 1983. Due to the quick change in profile of the rustic tree lodge, National Geographic ran an article A New Look at Kenya's "Treetops" in October 1956.

Author Willard Price visited while researching his novel Safari Adventure''.

Paul McCartney and Beatles roadie Mal Evans stayed at the hotel while on safari in 1966. Returning from the safari trip, McCartney stated that he came up with the concept of "Sgt. Peppers Lonely Hearts Club Band" on the flight from Nairobi to London.

References

External links

1954 fires in Africa
Hotel buildings completed in 1932
Hotels in Kenya
Tourist attractions in Kenya